The Geoffrey Faber Memorial Prize is a British literary prize established in 1963 in tribute to Geoffrey Faber, founder and first Chairman of the publisher Faber & Faber. It recognises a single volume of poetry or fiction by a United Kingdom, Irish or Commonwealth author under 40 years of age on the date of publication, and is in alternating years awarded to poetry and fiction (including short stories).

The prize is worth £1500.

The prize jury, comprising three reviewers, is selected by literary editors of journals and newspapers that regularly publish reviews of poetry and fiction.

In its first year, the prize was awarded to Christopher Middleton and George MacBeth for poetry. The first win by a short-story collection, The Quantity Theory of Insanity by Will Self, was in 1993.

Winners

Notes

References

External links
 The Geoffrey Faber Memorial Prize website

Awards established in 1963
1963 establishments in the United Kingdom

Commonwealth literary awards
British fiction awards
British poetry awards
Literary awards honouring young writers